Mt. Olive Baptist Church is a historic Baptist church located at 301 Church Street in Mullins, Marion County, South Carolina.  It was built between 1922 and 1926, and is a one-story, Late Gothic Revival style brick cruciform building.  It has a complex hip and gable roof and features twin corner towers of unequal height, a stained glass oculus above each entrance at the second level, a belfry containing four large pointed arch openings, and a large tripartite Gothic-arched leaded stained glass window flanked by stained glass lancet windows. The church played a major role in the African-American community in Mullins.

It was added to the National Register of Historic Places in 2000.

References

African-American history of South Carolina
Baptist churches in South Carolina
Churches on the National Register of Historic Places in South Carolina
Gothic Revival church buildings in South Carolina
Churches completed in 1926
20th-century Baptist churches in the United States
Buildings and structures in Marion County, South Carolina
National Register of Historic Places in Marion County, South Carolina